Eugene Lawrence Rogan,  (born 31 October 1960) is an American historian of the Middle East and North Africa from the late Ottoman era to the present. He is currently Professor of Modern Middle Eastern History at the University of Oxford.

Education and career
After completing his undergraduate degree at Columbia University in economics, he pursued a masters degree in Middle Eastern studies at Harvard University, graduating in 1984, after which he completed a doctorate in Middle Eastern studies at the same university in 1991. Rogan joined the University of Oxford's Faculty of Oriental Studies as a lecturer in 1991. Since 1991, he has been a Fellow at St Antony's College, Oxford, and Professor of Modern Middle Eastern History at the University of Oxford since 2015.

Honours
In July 2017, Rogan was elected a Fellow of the British Academy (FBA), the United Kingdom's national academy for the humanities and social sciences.

Personal life 
Rogan is married to Oxford professor Ngaire Woods, who is also the founding dean of the Blavatnik School of Government.

Selected works
Frontiers of the State in the Late Ottoman Empire (Cambridge University Press, 1999).
The War for Palestine: Rewriting the History of 1948 (Cambridge University Press, 2001).
Outside In: On the Margins of the Modern Middle East (I.B. Tauris, 2002).
The Arabs: A History (Penguin, 2009).
The Fall of the Ottomans: The Great War in the Middle East, 1914–1920 (Penguin, 2015).

References 

1960 births
Living people
Columbia College (New York) alumni
Harvard University alumni
Academics of the University of Oxford
Fellows of St Antony's College, Oxford
Fellows of the British Academy
Historians of the Middle East